Ali Bahadur II (1832–1873) (r. 1850–1858) was the last ruler (Nawab) of the Banda (state). He decided to join the unsuccessful Indian Rebellion of 1857, he joined forces of Rani of Jhansi, Rao Sahib and Tantia Tope and was one of Major Commanders of Rebel force at Gwalior and in the aftermath his state was annexed by the British Raj. He surrendered in November 1858 and lived in exile at Indore with Pension of Rs. 36,000 per annum and he died in 1873.

He was a descendant of Peshwa Baji Rao I and his Muslim wife Mastani.

References

Indian Hindus
Peshwa dynasty
People of the Maratha Empire
Marathi people
19th-century Indian monarchs
1832 births
1873 deaths